Nimjerduiyeh (also Romanized as Nīmjerdū’īyeh; also known as Namak Rūd, Nīmjerd, and Nīmkurd) is a village in Raviz Rural District, Koshkuiyeh District, Rafsanjan County, Kerman Province, Iran. At the 2006 census, its population was 97, in 27 families.

References 

Populated places in Rafsanjan County